The 2021–22 LBA season is the 100th season of the Lega Basket Serie A (LBA), the men's top tier professional basketball division of the Italian basketball league system.

Teams

Promotion and relegation 
Virtus Roma withdrew in the past season. Cantu ended on 15th place and therefore relegated to the Serie A2.

Napoli and Tortona were two best teams in Serie A2 and therefore promoted to Serie A.

Number of teams by region

Venues and locations 

Source:

Managerial changes

Referees
A total of 38 FIP officials set to work on the 2020-21 season in Lega Basket Serie A:

Notes
 Newly promoted to the Serie A

Regular season 
In the regular season, teams play against each other home-and-away in a round-robin format. The matchdays are from September 25, 2021, to May 8, 2022.

League table

Playoffs 

The LBA playoffs quarterfinals and semifinals are best of five formats, while the finals series are best of seven format. The playoffs will start in May 2022, to finish in June 2022, depending on result.

Serie A clubs in European competitions

See also 

 2021 Italian Basketball Supercup

References

External links 
 Lega Basket website 

Lega Basket Serie A seasons
Italian
2021–22 in Italian basketball